D'haquille "Duke" Williams  (born May 13, 1993) is a professional gridiron football wide receiver for the Hamilton Tiger-Cats of the Canadian Football League (CFL). He played college football at Auburn. After going undrafted and spending the 2016 offseason with the Los Angeles Rams, he made his professional debut in 2017 with the Edmonton Eskimos. Williams became one of the CFL's most dominant receiving threats, leading the league in receiving in 2018. Following his second season in the CFl, he returned to the United States for another shot at playing in the National Football League. He signed with the Buffalo Bills in 2019.

High school career
Williams attended East St. John High School in Reserve, Louisiana, where he played high school football. As a senior, he had 1,495 receiving yards and 25 touchdowns.

College career
Williams attended Mississippi Gulf Coast Community College from 2012 to 2013. In two years, he had 118 receptions for 2,028 yards and 26 touchdowns.

Considered a five-star recruit by Rivals.com, Williams was listed as the No. 1 junior college prospect in 2014. He initially committed to Louisiana State University but changed to Auburn University.

In his first game at Auburn, Williams had nine receptions for 154 yards and a touchdown. He was dismissed from Auburn on October 6, 2015, for an unidentified violation of team rules. William finished the 2015 season with 12 catches for 147 yards and one touchdown.

Professional career

Los Angeles Rams 
On May 10, 2016, Williams signed a 3-year deal with the Los Angeles Rams as an undrafted free agent. On September 3, 2016, he was waived by the Rams as part of final roster cuts.

Edmonton Eskimos 
Williams signed with the Edmonton Eskimos of the Canadian Football League (CFL) before the 2017 season. Williams caught four passes for 110 yards and a touchdown against the BC Lions in his professional regular season debut. Williams went on to have a strong first season in the CFL, catching 46 passes for 508 yards with two touchdowns. Williams became a star player in the CFL in 2018, earning a Top Performers of the Month designation for the months of June and July and ultimately finished the season with the most receiving yards in the league with 1,579. On January 5, 2019, Williams was released by the Edmonton Eskimos in order to pursue NFL opportunities.

Buffalo Bills 
On January 7, 2019, Williams signed with the Buffalo Bills of the NFL. Williams played in all four preseason games for the Bills, catching eight passes for 78 yards with two touchdowns. He was released during final roster cuts on August 31, 2019 and was signed to the practice squad the next day. On October 5, 2019, Williams was promoted to the active roster. He caught 4 passes for 29 yards and the game winning touchdown in a 14–7 Bills win over the Tennessee Titans on October 6, 2019. After suffering a shoulder injury against the Miami Dolphins in week 7, Williams was deactivated for the rest of the season until week 17 when the Bills rested numerous starters against the New York Jets, having already clinched a playoff berth. Williams caught six passes for 108 yards during the 13–6 loss.

Williams was placed on the reserve/COVID-19 list by the Bills on July 29, 2020. He was activated on August 9, 2020. Williams was waived as part of final roster cuts on September 5, 2020, but was re-signed to the practice squad the next day. He was elevated to the active roster on October 24 and January 8, 2021, for the team's week 7 and wild card playoff games against the New York Jets and Indianapolis Colts, and reverted to the practice squad after each game. On January 26, 2021, Williams signed a reserves/futures contract with the Bills. He was waived/injured on August 23, 2021 and placed on injured reserve. On August 26 he was released from injured reserve with an injury settlement.

Saskatchewan Roughriders
On October 4, 2021, Williams signed with the Saskatchewan Roughriders.
On February 5, 2022, Williams signed a one-year, $260,000 contract extension. On July 20, 2022 the CFL announced that Williams had been suspended for one game after he took the helmet off of Toronto Argonauts defensive back Shaquille Richardson and threw it at him during warmups for the leagues Touchdown Atlantic game.

References

External links
Saskatchewan Roughriders bio
Buffalo Bills bio
Los Angeles Rams bio
Auburn Tigers bio 

1993 births
Living people
American football wide receivers
American players of Canadian football
Auburn Tigers football players
Buffalo Bills players
Canadian football wide receivers
Edmonton Elks players
Los Angeles Rams players
Mississippi Gulf Coast Bulldogs football players
People from LaPlace, Louisiana
People from Reserve, Louisiana
Players of American football from Louisiana
Saskatchewan Roughriders players